Abhinava is an Indian name. The Sanskrit word  has the meaning "new". Notable people with the name include:

 Abhinav Bali (born 1985), Indian cricketer
 Abhinav Bindra (born 1982), Indian shooter and Olympic champion
 Abhinav Gomatam, Indian Telugu-language film actor
 Abhinav Kamal (born 1984), Indian entrepreneur and film director
 Abhinav Kashyap, Indian film director and screenwriter
 Abhinav Mukund (born 1990), Indian cricketer
 Abhinav Puri (born 1994), Indian cricketer
 Abhinav Shukla (producer), Indian film and television show producer
 Dev (Tamil actor), Indian film actor and content producer who was credited as Abhinav until 2019

References 

Indian masculine given names
Nepalese masculine given names